The Angelic Gospel Singers were an American gospel group from Philadelphia founded and led by Margaret Wells Allison. The group continued through Allison's death in 2008; the group was called "the longest consistently selling female gospel group in African American history" by the Encyclopedia of American Gospel Music.

Allison and her sister, Josephine McDowell, formed the group in 1944 along with two friends, Ella Mae Norris and Lucille Shird, who had sung with Allison in the group Spiritual Echoes of Philadelphia. The group toured extensively on the East Coast and central United States in the 1940s and 1950s and signed a recording contract with Philadelphia-based Gotham Records in 1947. Their recording "Touch Me, Lord Jesus" was a hit on R&B stations in 1949 and sold over a million records. They recorded several songs with the Dixie Hummingbirds and toured with them as well. In 1955 Gotham Records shut down due to an impending tax evasion charge; the group signed with Chess Records and recorded an album, but their contract was soon after bought out by Nashboro Records, the label which released the Angelic's output until 1982.

In 1961 the group added its first male member, Thomas Mobley, and released several albums through the late 1960s, increasing their output on Nashboro in the late 1970s with an album a year. In the following decade they moved to Malaco Records, who issued their albums through the 1990s. During this time the group began crediting themselves as Margaret Allison & the Angelic Gospel Singers. They returned to the Billboard charts in the late 1980s, when their albums I've Got Victory reached #26 on the Gospel Albums chart in 1986 and Out of the Depths reached #28 in 1987.

The Angelic Gospel Singers continued performing and touring through the mid-2000s. Margaret Allison's death on July 30, 2008 marked the end of the group's run.  Bernice Cole died in 2006 at the age of 85.

Members
Margaret Wells Allison (1944-2008)
Josephine Wells McDowell (1944-2008)
Ella Mae Norris (1944-1955)
Lucille Shird (1944-1953)
Bernice Cole (1951-1956, 1975-2006)
Thomas Mobley (1961-1973)
Geraldine Morris (1973-1974)
Pauline Turner (1982-)
Darryl Richmond (bass guitar, vocals 1984-)
John Richmond (drums, 1984- )
Francis Shorty Leggett (guitar, 1988- )
Teresa Burton (vocals, 1985- )

Discography
Albums
1961: My Sweet Home
1964: Songs From The Heart
1967: The Best Of The Angelic Gospel Singers
1968: Jesus Paid It All
1970: Somebody Saved Me
1974: Jesus Will Never Say No
1975: I'm Bound For Mount Zion
1977: Gotta Find A Better Home
1978: Margaret, Josephine And Bernice
1979: Come Over Here
1979: Together 34 Years
1980: The Best Of The Angelic Gospel Singers Vol 2
1981: I'll Go With You
1982: Touch Me Lord Jesus 
1983: Don't Stop Praying
1984: Rejoice: Best Of The Angelic Gospel Singers
1984: The Early Years
1984: 40 Years
1986: I've Got Victory
1987: Out Of The Depths
1989: Lord You Gave Me Another Chance
1992: He's My Ever Present Help
1993: I'll Live Again
1994: I've Weathered The Storm
1995: Try God
1997: The Big Question (Where Will You Spend Eternity)
1997: Jesus Is A Burden Bearer
2000: Home In The Rock

Singles
1949: Jesus/There Is No Friend
1949: Just Jesus/This Same Jesus
1949: Touch Me, Lord Jesus/When My Savior Calls Me Home
1949: Yes, My Jesus Cares/Somebody Saved Me
1950: Back To The Dust/He Never Has Let Me Alone
1950: My Life Will Be Sweeter/There Must Be A Heaven Somewhere
1950: Remember Me/Follow In His Footsteps
1951: Dear Lord, Look Down Upon Me/Standing Out On The Highway
1951: Do Lord, Remember Me/Almost Persuaded
1951: Glory, Glory Hallelujah/I'm On My Way To Heaven Anyhow
1951: Jesus Will Answer Prayer/In The Morning
1952: Call On Jesus In Secret Prayer/I Heard Mother Call My Name
1952: Glory, Glory To The Newborn King/Jesus Christ Is Born
1952: Tell The Angels/My Faith Looks Up To Thee
1953: A Child Is Born/Christmas Morning
1953: I Thank You Lord/Do Not Pass Me By, O Gentle Savior
1953: If It Wasn't For The Lord/God's Roll
1953: Jesus Will Carry You Through/My Lord And I
1953: Since Jesus Came Into My Heart/Jesus Is All The World To Me
1954: Angels Watching Over Me/I'm Going Home To Jesus
1955: Jesus Is The Light Of The World/Only A Look
1955: Jesus Never Fails Me/I'll Be Alright
1955: Jesus Paid It All/I Want To See Him
1957: I've Weathered The Storm/Every Day
1959: Yes! Nobody Knows My Troubles/Touch Me Lord Jesus
1960: All That I Need Is Jesus/Out Of The Depths
1960: Jesus Is A Way-Maker/My Sweet Home
1961: I'm Getting Nearer (Pt 1)/I'm Getting Nearer (Pt 2)
1962: Be Sure He'll Take Care/He Never Left Me Alone
1962: Everybody Ought To Pray/Goin' Over Yonder
1963: I Shall Know Him/I Want To Go To Heaven
1964: Do Lord, Remember Me/Yes! He'll Take Care Of You
1965: Don't Know What I'd Do (Without The Lord)/Sometimes I Feel My Time Ain't Long
1966: Jesus, When Troubles Burden Me/Standing On The Highway
1968: Father I Stretch My Hand/Glory To The New Born King
1969: I Hope It Won't Be This Way Always/You Don't Know (What The Lord Has Done)

References

American gospel musical groups
Musical groups from Philadelphia